Synochoneura fansipangana is a moth of the family Tortricidae. It is found in Vietnam.

The wingspan is 20 mm. The ground colour of the forewings consists of a yellow costal fascia, tinged rust along the costa. The second area of ground colour from the end of the median cell to the tornus is tinged rust towards the middle of the wing and proximally. The hindwings are greyish brown.

References

Moths described in 2008
Archipini
Moths of Asia
Taxa named by Józef Razowski